Every Witch Way is an American teen sitcom that premiered on Nickelodeon on January 1, 2014. It is the United States' version of Nickelodeon Latin America from the series Grachi, starring with Isabella Castillo. The series tells the story of 14-year-old Emma Alonso who moves to Miami, Florida, with her father, and finds out that she's a witch and the most powerful of her generation.

On March 13, 2014, Nickelodeon announced a second season of Every Witch Way that aired from July 7, 2014, to August 8, 2014.

On July 31, 2014, Nickelodeon announced a third season, that aired from January 5, 2015 to January 30, 2015.

On February 25, 2015, Nickelodeon announced a fourth season and a spin-off series called W.I.T.s Academy, which premiered on October 5, 2015.

Series overview
{| class="wikitable plainrowheaders" style="text-align:center;"
|- 
! scope="col" style="padding:0 9px;" rowspan="2" colspan="2"| Season
! scope="col" style="padding:0 9px;" rowspan="2"| Episodes
! scope="col" style="padding:0 90px;" colspan="2"| Originally aired (U.S. dates)
|-
! scope="col" | First aired
! scope="col" | Last aired
|-
| scope="row" style="background:#FF5A83; text-align:center;"|
| [[List of Every Witch Way episodes#Season 1 (2014)|1]]
| 20
| 
|  
|-
| scope="row" style="background:#FFAA80; text-align:center;"|
| [[List of Every Witch Way episodes#Season 2 (2014)|2]]
| 23
| 
|  
|-
| scope="row" style="background:#175D88; color:#100; text-align:center;"|
| colspan="2" | [[List of Every Witch Way episodes#Special (2014)|Special]]
| colspan="2" | November 26, 2014
|-
| scope="row" style="background:#0CEDE6; text-align:center;"| 
| [[List of Every Witch Way episodes#Season 3 (2015)|3]]
| 20
| 
| 
|- 
| scope="row" style="background:#6D468D; color:#100; text-align:center;"|
| [[List of Every Witch Way episodes#Season 4 (2015)|4]]
| 19
| 
| 
|}

Episodes

Season 1 (2014)

Season 2 (2014)
Filming for this season began on March 31, 2014, as confirmed on Twitter by various cast members.
Rahart Adams appears in this season as Jax Novoa.
Tyler Alvarez is absent for one episode, "The Emma Squad".

Special (2014)

Season 3 (2015)
This season began filming in October 2014.

Season 4 (2015)
Julia Antonelli stars as Jessie Novoa, Jax's little sister.
Betty Monroe stars as Liana Woods, Jax's and Jessie's mother.

References

External links
Every Witch Way episodes at Futon Critic

Every Witch Way
Every Witch Way
Every Witch Way
Every Witch Way
Every Witch Way